Pterochaeta is a monotypic plant genus in the Asteraceae family, endemic to Western Australia. It was first described in 1845 by Joachim Steetz and its only species is Pterochaeta paniculata.

It has been found to be a symptomless host of the pathogen, Phytophthora cinnamomi.

References

External links
Pterochaeta paniculata occurrence data from Australasian Virtual Herbarium

Taxa named by Joachim Steetz
Plants described in 1845
Gnaphalieae